Pradyut Barman was a former Indian association football player. He was part of the team that won the gold medal at the 1962 Asian Games at Jakarta. He played for Eastern Railway and Mohun Bagan in domestic tournaments.

Honours

India
Asian Games Gold medal: 1962
Merdeka Tournament third-place: 1965

East Bengal
IFA Shield: 1958
Rovers Cup: 1960
DCM Trophy: 1960

Bengal
Santosh Trophy: 1958–59, 1959–60

Railway
Santosh Trophy: 1961–62

Eastern Railway
Calcutta Football League: 1958

Mohun Bagan
Calcutta Football League: 1964, 1965
Durand Cup: 1964, 1965
Rovers Cup: 1964, 1968

References

1935 births
2016 deaths
Indian footballers
India international footballers
Footballers from Kolkata
Association football goalkeepers
Mohun Bagan AC players
East Bengal Club players
Asian Games medalists in football
Medalists at the 1962 Asian Games
Footballers at the 1962 Asian Games
Asian Games gold medalists for India